Hugh Pescod, better known as Redlight, is a British DJ, record producer, re mixer and composer from Bristol.

Biography
Redlight was brought up around 90's warehouse rave culture in Bristol. His music and career has spanned over a decade, having spent 12 years grafting on the underground and popping up for air in 2012 with a couple of Top 10 UK hits in the national charts. He has since then released his debut solo album entitled 'X Colour'.

He has collaborated with artists such as Mobb Deep, Raekwon (Wu-Tang Clan). Remixed acts including Mary J. Blige and Tink, defining genres, remaining one of the UK's most consistent and exciting producers of recent years with many more to come.

With his label Lobster Boy embracing a love for House, Techno, Hip Hop and vocal-lead dance music, whilst channeling his knowledge and love of Jungle, DnB and bass music, it is a whole new genre-free 'cross-cultured dance music' label. After exploring a versatile sound on his debut album, the visionary producer has taken things back to his club roots with a mix tape – ‘Templates Volume 1’ which focuses on tracks crafted specifically for his world-renowned DJ sets. The mix tape series is all about club music. For most of the events Redlight plays, he usually comes with new productions every time. The mix tape series is a culmination of all these productions and is a selection of the best tunes and remixes he has done and will continue to do so.

Early career 
Hugh Pescod began his career in the early 2000s under the alias DJ Clipz, with a string of releases on various drum and bass labels including Full Cycle and Digital Soundboy. In 2009 he diversified his production style and adopted the alias Redlight, setting up the label Lobster Boy for his productions and debuting with his single "Rock The House" / "Twist Up" and the Lobster Boy EP.

2010 saw the release of two dance floor recordings: the first, "Stupid" on Shy FX's Digital Soundboy, featuring the vocals of Roses Gabor, and the second single, "What You Talking About!?" on Chase & Status's MTA Records, which featured Ms. Dynamite. In 2011 Redlight released two more tracks via Digital Soundboy in the shape of "Source 16" and "Progress" as well as his 2nd release on the MTA label "Get Out My Head". He has also remixed artists from the likes of Cee Lo Green and Maverick Sabre to Ms. Dynamite.

In 2012 he released his second single "Mosquito" / "Planet X" on the Lobster Boy imprint. His UK Top 10 track "Lost in Your Love" was released on Polydor and came with an official video. Later that year he has taken up the alias Animal Youth, which was used to release his remixes of the songs "Lose My Breath" by Destiny's Child and "Try Again" by Aaliyah through the single "Keep Up" / "Try Again". The single "Sixty Forty Zero" / "Crackle" was also released with this alias.

A single, "Switch It Off", was released on 22 April 2013. It was originally an independent, self-released free download before it was given new remixes by Ben Pearce and Paleman. On 10 March 2014, he released the 36 EP with appearances from Raekwon, Syron and Lotti. The title track entered the UK Singles Chart at number 81. The tracks "36" and "Get Money" were released as singles before the release of the EP and were given music videos.

Discography

Albums

Extended plays

Singles as Redlight

Singles as Clipz

Produced songs

Remixes

Other appearances

References

External links

1980 births
Living people
English electronic musicians
English house musicians
DJs from Bristol
English record producers
Musicians from Bristol